Circus Rookies is a lost 1928 American silent comedy film produced and distributed by MGM and directed by Edward Sedgwick. It starred the comedy team of Karl Dane and George K. Arthur.

Plot

Cast
Karl Dane as Oscar Thrust
George K. Arthur as Francis Byrd
Louise Lorraine as La Belle
Sydney Jarvis as Mr. Magoo (credited as Sidney Jarvis)
Fred Humes as Bimbo

unbilled
Lou Costello as Extra

References

External links

Stills at silenthollywood.com
Stills at hollywoodgorillamen.com

1928 films
American silent feature films
Films directed by Edward Sedgwick
Metro-Goldwyn-Mayer films
Silent American comedy films
1928 comedy films
American black-and-white films
Lost American films
1928 lost films
Lost comedy films
1920s American films
Films with screenplays by Richard Schayer